Vladimir Nicolaus Mackiw (1923, Stanisławów – 2001) was a Canadian inventor, industrialist, and chemist of Ukrainian origin who revolutionized the mining industry with his inventions and techniques.

External links 
Vladimir Nicolaus Mackiw - Canadian Mining Hall of Fame

1923 births
2001 deaths
People from Ivano-Frankivsk
Ukrainian emigrants to Canada
20th-century Ukrainian inventors
20th-century Canadian inventors
Ukrainian chemists
Canadian chemists
20th-century Ukrainian scientists
20th-century Canadian scientists
University of Breslau alumni
University of Erlangen-Nuremberg alumni
Scientists from Ontario
KU Leuven alumni
Fellows of the Minerals, Metals & Materials Society